Oreochromis saka is a species of cichlid fish that is endemic to Lake Malawi and Lake Malombe in East Africa where it inhabits relatively shallow coastal areas. It is part of the subgenus Nyasalapia, which are known as chambo. The validity of this species is questionable and a taxonomic review recommended that it should be considered a synonym of O. karongae (the two only differ by pharyngeal bones and teeth).

References

saka
Fish of Lake Malawi
Fish described in 1953